Trevor Kirczenow (born 1985) is a transgender health researcher and diabetes healthcare advocate. He is an author and community organizer in the field of LGBTQ lactation and infant feeding. He has run twice as a candidate for the Liberal Party of Canada.

Biography
Kirczenow earned a Bachelor of Political Science honours degree from the University of British Columbia.

Research
In 2014, Kirczenow formed a research team through the University of Ottawa which obtained funding from the Canadian Institutes of Health Research to conduct qualitative research about transmasculine individuals' experiences of pregnancy, birthing, and feeding their newborns.

The group's research paper, "Transmasculine individuals’ experiences with lactation, chestfeeding, and gender identity: a qualitative study," contains the first known use of the word "chestfeeding" in the title of an academic paper, which is a term preferred by some transmasculine individuals to describe their lactation and nursing relationship.

Kirczenow says "There is this assumption that goes along with the ‘born in the wrong body’ narrative, that if you are a trans guy you would want a hysterectomy and never use your body to carry a pregnancy." He noted that none of the participants' surgeons discussed the potential for future chestfeeding before performing top surgery, and that "the range of experiences and showing more nuance, more complexity, about transgender lives is what is most important in this study."

Federal politics 
Kirczenow was the first openly transgender candidate to have been nominated by a major Canadian political party for a federal election. He ran for the Liberal Party candidate for Provencher in the 2019 Canadian federal election and the 2021 Canadian federal election, finishing second both times.

Pregnancy and birth 
Having been assigned female at birth, Kirczenow transitioned to male by taking testosterone and undergoing chest surgery.  When he and his partner decided to start a family, on advice from a doctor, Kirczenow stopped hormone therapy and was able to become pregnant. Although Kirczenow did not plan to breastfeed and assumed it would not be possible, he decided to try after learning that "even a small amount of milk could be really valuable to my baby," and that "breastfeeding is about more than the milk. It can be a relationship too and a whole way of parenting."

Application for La Leche League leadership
Before his child was born, Kirczenow (under his married name, MacDonald), sought peer-to-peer support from his local chapter of La Leche League (LLL), the international breastfeeding organization. He was later asked to assume a volunteer leadership position. However, La Leche League Canada (LLLC) rejected his query, saying "the topic has never arisen in the 56-year history of our organization" and "since an LLLC leader is a mother who breastfed a baby, a man cannot become an LLLC leader."

The board of La Leche League International (LLLI) reviewed the policy, citing its mandate to be a "nondiscriminatory service organization." A year later, they revised their policy to allow leaders to serve no matter their gender. LLLI spokesperson Diana West commented, "It was thought that only women could breastfeed. Once it became clear it wasn’t as straightforward as that, the policy had to change. We’re just trying to be on the right side of history. Yes, we took a year to do it, but we did it in a way that was fair and unequivocal."

In 2016, Kirczenow became the first-ever transgender man to be accredited as a La Leche League leader. LLLI said to other leaders: "We recognize that any breastfeeding parent, regardless of whether they self-identify as a mother or father, should be – and is now – welcome to investigate LLL Leadership. There are other prerequisites that a potential Leader needs to satisfy, but being a woman isn't one of them.”

Community organization and advocacy
In 2012, Kirczenow founded the international advocacy and support group, "Birthing and Breast or Chestfeeding Trans People and Allies". The group currently has over 6800 members.

After his son was diagnosed with Type 1 diabetes, Kirczenow co-founded the advocacy group Emergency Diabetes Support for Manitobans in 2020, advocating for improved coverage in Manitoba and a national Pharmacare plan for people who cannot afford lifesaving medication. The group was successful in lobbying for continuous glucose monitors and improvements to insulin pump coverage from the province.

Midwifery care for trans clients
In 2015, several commentators claimed that Kirczenow, who was attended by midwives during his pregnancies, had forced the Midwives Alliance of North America (MANA) to stop using gendered language such as "mothers" and "pregnant women." However, Snopes reported that while MANA did change some of the language in their core materials to clarify they welcomed transgender and cisgender clients in their scope of practice, those decisions were based on their own standards of care, inclusion, and position on gender identity, and not due to pressure from Kirczenow or any other trans people.

Following MANA's announcement, a group of midwives penned an open letter to MANA protesting what they viewed as "the erasure of women from the language of birth." Kirczenow wrote a response in the Huffington Post saying that "trans, genderqueer and intersex people have been giving birth for as long as women-identified people have" and "it is possible to be inclusive." Several other associations of midwives subsequently issued statements supportive of MANA and gender nonconforming clients.

Works
Kirczenow, under his married last name MacDonald, has written for The Guardian, The Advocate, the Huffington Post, Out Magazine and This Magazine. He is a public speaker about transgender people and reproductive health, including lactation.

He is first author on the first peer-reviewed medical research article on the subject of transmasculine infant chestfeeding.

Kirczenow is the author of a tip sheet for volunteer leaders who are providing support to transgender, transsexual, and genderfluid individuals who wish to nurse their babies and was profiled in La Leche League International's magazine, Breastfeeding Today.

Kirczenow's 2016 biography, "Where's the Mother? Stories from a Transgender Dad," has been added to the required reading list for Doula Trainings International, who commented that the book is "eye-opening for new and seasoned doulas alike." It was reviewed by Publishers Weekly as "frank, clever, and easy to process ... a refreshing and insightful narrative." The work has also received coverage in The New York Times, The Guardian, The Toronto Star, Buzzfeed, Gay Star News, Metro UK, The Advocate, Rewire, and on the Canadian Television Network's national newscast.

References

1985 births
Living people
Transgender men
Canadian transgender writers
Canadian male non-fiction writers
21st-century Canadian non-fiction writers
Liberal Party of Canada candidates for the Canadian House of Commons
Candidates in the 2019 Canadian federal election
Candidates in the 2021 Canadian federal election
Manitoba candidates for Member of Parliament
Canadian LGBT politicians
Canadian classical violinists
LGBT classical musicians
21st-century Canadian LGBT people